The broad-eared horseshoe bat (Rhinolophus euryotis) is a species of bat in the family Rhinolophidae. It is found in Indonesia and Papua New Guinea.

References

Rhinolophidae
Bats of Oceania
Bats of Indonesia
Mammals of Papua New Guinea
Mammals of Western New Guinea
Least concern biota of Asia
Least concern biota of Oceania
Mammals described in 1835
Taxonomy articles created by Polbot
Taxa named by Coenraad Jacob Temminck
Bats of New Guinea